The 1931 Homestead Grays baseball team competed as an independent in Negro league baseball during the 1931 baseball season. The team compiled a 34–21–1 record. 

The team featured seven individuals who were later inducted into the Baseball Hall of Fame: manager Cumberland Posey, first baseman Oscar Charleston; catcher Josh Gibson; third baseman Jud Wilson; and pitchers Bill Foster, Smokey Joe Williams, and Satchel Paige. 

The team's leading batters were:
 Third baseman Jud Wilson - .415 batting average, .707 slugging percentage, 10 home runs, and 44 RBIs
 First baseman Oscar Charleston - .333 batting average
 Second baseman George Scales - .318 batting average, .555 slugging percentage
 Catcher Josh Gibson - .311 batting average

The team's leading pitchers were Bill Foster (9–2, 2.34 ERA) and Smokey Joe Williams (6–2, 2.41 ERA).

References

1931 in sports in Pennsylvania
Negro league baseball seasons
Homestead Grays